Chang Fan is a Taiwanese politician. He was the Political Deputy Minister of Finance since 17 February 2014 until 20 May 2016.

Early life
Chang obtained his bachelor's degree in science from Chung Yuan Christian University. He then obtained his master's degree in urban and regional planning from National Chung Hsing University and doctoral degree in land economics from National Chengchi University.

Political career
He formerly served as the section chief, specialist, deputy chief and chief of the Industrial Development Bureau of the Ministry of Economic Affairs. He also served as researcher, senior executive and senior secretary at the Legislative Yuan. He served as the deputy director-general of the National Property Administration of the Ministry of Finance where he made outstanding contributions to the public land development projects. He finally became the acting commissioner of the urban and rural development department of the New Taipei City Government.

See also
 Ministry of Finance (Republic of China)

References

Taiwanese Ministers of Finance
Living people
Chung Yuan Christian University alumni
National Chung Hsing University alumni
National Chengchi University alumni
Year of birth missing (living people)